Bird Song is part of Mannheim Steamroller's Ambience collection.  It was released in 2001 on CD by American Gramaphone and features 8 bird song tracks.

The Ambience collection is a series of natural recordings with musical elements composed by Chip Davis.

Track listing
 "Awakening" – 6:54
 "Another Time" – 6:46
 "Cherry Blossoms" – 5:35
 "Wooley Green" – 5:16
 "The Hunt" – 10:36
 "Green Lace" – 5:42
 "Childhood Memory" – 5:08
 "Big Bird" – 5:01

Personnel 

Chip Davis – percussion
Bobby Jenkins – oboe
Jackson Berkey – keyboards
Almeda Berkey – keyboards
Roxanne Layton – percussion, woodwinds
Ron Cooley – guitar, bass
Arnie Roth – strings
Chuck Penington – orchestra conductor

References
Mannheim Steamroller Bird Song compact disc.  American Gramaphone AG201-2

Mannheim Steamroller albums
2001 albums
American Gramaphone albums